Upside Out is a CD by the Riverside City College Jazz Ensemble and combo; this was released in 2003 on the Sea Breeze Vista Jazz label.  Critic Jack Bowers notes, "A consistently rewarding album by top-drawer college-level jazz ensemble and trio."  Most notably the CD continues to receive airplay through the country due to the high level of the music on the recording.

Background

The Riverside City College Jazz Ensemble has been existence for over 40 years; the combos are subgroups of the larger ensemble.  The 2003 CD Upside out is a by product of the consistency the jazz studies department at Riverside City College maintains.  Full-time students make up the personnel of the performing groups and keep a busy schedule of performances and recording dates.   Besides recording the CD Upside Out (and others) RCC jazz groups have traveled to the UNC Greeley, Reno, and the University of Texas Jazz Festivals, and have also toured to Japan and Hawaii. The group finished first place in the 2 year Big Band division at the 2010 University of Nevada, Reno Jazz Festival.  Guest artists with this groups in recent years have included Carl Saunders, James Moody, Bob McChesney, Mike Stern, Poncho Sanchez, Gary Foster, Alex Iles, Brandon Fields, The Airmen of Note,  Bill Reichenbach, Lanny Morgan, Kye Palmer, Kim Richmond, and Rick Margitza.  The ensemble also commissions a new works for Jazz Ensemble each spring. Recent commissions have come from noted jazz writers Bob Curnow, Jack Cooper (composed title track from Upside Out), David Caffey, Matt Harris, James Miley, Glenn Morrissette, Steven Schmidt and Sandy Megas.

Promotion
The music from the CD was played several times on tour with the RCC Jazz Ensemble to include a concert tour of Japan and performances at the Reno Jazz Festival and I.A.J.E. Convention.  The CD was distributed throughout the United States to radio stations, 91.3 KVLU-NPR reported on their January 2004 playlist that Upside Out received "heavy" play, which was not an uncommon reception for the CD.

Reception

The CD was critically acclaimed and has continued to receive airplay throughout the country with jazz disc jockeys due to the high level of the music and musicianship on the CD.  There are numerous examples of this ongoing airplay with jazz stations such as WBIO (IN), WPKN (CT), WAER (NY), and KSDS (CA).

"...In other words, this set of post-bop jazz is on a higher level than nearly all other college recordings, and the musicians sound as if they are 30 rather than 20. Sea Breeze, a label that has extensively documented college and high-school bands, has a strong winner in Upside Out."

Scott Yanow, Allmusic Guide

Track listing

Recording Sessions
 Tracks 1-8 - 2002/2003, recorded at Riverside Community College, Riverside, CA (in studio)
 Track 9 - 2003 Longhorn Jazz Festival, Austin, TX (live)

Print music from this recording 
Are We There Yet? is published by Sierra Music Publications 
Upside Out was commissioned by the Riverside City College Jazz Ensemble, Charlie Richard - director and is published by UNC Jazz Press
Widow's Walk is published by UNC Jazz Press
Nasty Dance is published by Kendor Music Publications

Personnel

Musicians
Conductor: Charlie Richard
Saxes and woodwinds: Travis Alegria, Kelly Corbin, Ioana Fleming, Jason Jamerson, Demetrius Patin, Bill Preci, Trevor Shiffermiller, James Reinbolt, Jaime Royal, Gerry Whitaker
Trumpets and flugelhorns: Everardo Aguilar, Kinkch Degrate, Paul Karandos, Tatsuya Koyama, Brian Mantz, Don Marino II, Carlos Villa, Kevin Young
Trombones: Dan Bigler, Diane Bigler, Rick Covarubias, Frank Hickman, Joe Martinez, Marcos Rodriguez, Nicholas Terwilliger, Aaron Wharton
Guitar: James DePrato, Josh Miller, Erin Von Pingle
Piano: David Peoples, Erin Von Pingle
Bass: Bill Dickson, Shane Jordan, Ferrari Watts
Drums: Jon McCammon, Dan Rocadio, Chad Villarreal
Percussion: Michael Gaylord, Anna Perotta, Angela Thomas

Production
Recording engineer, mixing: Charlie Richard
Mastering: D.J. Alverson
Liner notes: David Caffey
Cover art and graphic design: Joan Rovan Wales

Charts

See also
Riverside City College

References

External links

Upside Out and Riverside City College Jazz Ensemble at JazzTimes.com

Riverside City College Jazz

2003 albums
Jazz albums by American artists
Big band albums
Mainstream jazz albums
Education in Riverside, California